Stephen Harris Davies (1881-1961) was the third Bishop of Carpentaria.

Early life 
Davies was born in 1883 and educated at St. John's School, Leatherhead, and Emmanuel College, Cambridge.

Religious life 
Davies was  ordained in 1909. After a curacy at St Matthew's, Holbeck he emigrated to Australia where he joined the Bush Brotherhood of St Paul in Charleville, Queensland, serving as its head until his ordination to the episcopate. In 1925 he ordained the first two Torres Strait Islanders to become priests, Poey Passi and Joseph Lui.

Later life 
Davies retired in 1949 and died on 29 November 1961. There is a memorial to him at St Michael, Waters Upton.

References

1883 births
People educated at St John's School, Leatherhead
Alumni of Emmanuel College, Cambridge
Anglican bishops of Carpentaria
20th-century Anglican bishops in Australia
1961 deaths
Bush Brotherhood priests